The 18th Central American and Caribbean Games were held in Maracaibo,  Venezuela from August 8 to August 22, 1998, and included 31 nations and a total of 5,200 competitors.

Sports
31 sports were contested at the 1998 Games:

  Basketball 

 Racquetball

Medals

References
 CubaWeb
 Meta
 

 
Central American and Caribbean Games, 1998
Central American and Caribbean Games, 1998
Central American and Caribbean Games
Central American and Caribbean Games, 1998
1998 in Central American sport
1998 in Caribbean sport
Sports competitions in Maracaibo
Multi-sport events in Venezuela
20th century in Maracaibo
August 1998 sports events in South America